Poduyane railway station is the second largest railway station in Sofia, Bulgaria, after Sofia Central Station. It is located in Poduyane district and lies between Sitnyakovo Boulevard and General Danail Nikolaev Boulevard. The station building dates from 1930 and was mostly unchanged until its restoration in 2020.

Transport links 

 Tramway service: lines 20, 22
 Bus service: lines 11, 72, 75, 305, 404, 413

References 

Railway stations in Sofia
Railway stations opened in 1930